Scopula innominata is a moth of the  family Geometridae. It is found in Puerto Rico.

References

Moths described in 1940
innominata
Moths of the Caribbean